Christopher James Tremain (born 1966) is a New Zealand businessman and retired politician. He served as member of the New Zealand House of Representatives for the National Party from  until his retirement in 2014.

Family and personal life
Born in Napier in 1966, Tremain attended Taradale Primary School, Taradale Intermediate, Napier Boys' High School and Massey University. He obtained a Bachelor of Business Studies in accounting and a Diploma of Business Studies in marketing.

He has owned and operated a number of businesses in the Hawke's Bay region, including Tremain Real Estate, Tremain Travel and Colliers International.

Tremain's father was All Black flanker and Hawke's Bay Rugby Union captain Kel Tremain.

Tremain and his wife, Angela, have three children. He has been the driver of a number of community events including the annual Tremain Corporate Triathlon.

Member of Parliament

Tremain was first elected to parliament in the 2005 election, when he won the Napier electorate, beating incumbent Russell Fairbrother by 3951 votes. This was the first time that National had won Napier for more than 50 years.

In the 2008 election, Tremain retained the electorate with an increased majority.

After the election of the 50th New Zealand Parliament, Tremain was appointed a Minister outside Cabinet taking over the roles of Civil Defence from John Carter and Craig Foss, and the role of Consumer Affairs which had been held until the election by Simon Power.

He was replaced as Chief Whip of the National party by Michael Woodhouse, a List MP based in Dunedin. On 3 April 2012 Chris Tremain was promoted into Cabinet following the resignation of Nick Smith and gained the portfolio of Internal Affairs.

On 30 September 2013 Tremain announced that he would not contest the 2014 election. On leaving parliament Tremain was granted the right to retain the title of Honourable.

References

External links

 Chris Tremain profile, national.org.nz 
 Tremain website (archived)
 Chris Tremain profile, parliament.nz

|-

|-

|-

|-

1966 births
Living people
Massey University alumni
New Zealand businesspeople
New Zealand National Party MPs
People from Napier, New Zealand
People educated at Napier Boys' High School
New Zealand MPs for North Island electorates
Members of the New Zealand House of Representatives
Government ministers of New Zealand
Date of birth missing (living people)
21st-century New Zealand politicians